Group B of the 2014 Fed Cup Europe/Africa Zone Group III was one of four pools in the Europe/Africa Zone Group III of the 2014 Fed Cup. Three teams competed in a round robin competition, with the top team and the bottom two teams proceeding to their respective sections of the play-offs: the top team played for advancement to Group II.

Standings

Round-robin

Greece vs. Cyprus

Moldova vs. Cyprus

Greece vs. Moldova

References

External links 
 Fed Cup website

B3